Aliki (Αλίκη) is a feminine given name, the Greek form of Alice.

People with Greek feminine given name 

 Aliki Diplarakou (1912–2002), also known as Aliki, Lady Russell, was a winner of Miss Europe
 Aliki Kayaloglou is a Greek singer
 Aliki Konstantinidou, born 1989, Greek volleyball player
 Aliki Liacouras Brandenberg, pen name Aliki, born 1928, Greek-American children's book author
 Aliki Stamatina Vougiouklaki, 1934–1996, Greek actress
 Aliki Stergiadu, born 1972, Uzbekistan-born Soviet ice dancer
 Aliki Theofilopoulos Kiriakou, born 1972, Greek-American television animator and producer

Other people with given name 

 Aliki Fakate, born 1985, French rugby player

See also 

 Ariki, a Polynesian social rank
 Amelia Tokagahahau Aliki (1845–1895), queen of Uvea (Pacific Island)
 Alyki, a village and beach in Agkairia, Paros, Greece